The Citadel is an  mountain summit located in the Sierra Nevada mountain range, in Fresno County of central California, United States. The long approach to this remote peak is made via the John Muir Trail. The Northeast Arête, also known as Edge of Time Arête, is considered one of the classic climbing routes in the Sierra Nevada.

Climate
According to the Köppen climate classification system, The Citadel is located in an alpine climate zone. Most weather fronts originate in the Pacific Ocean, and travel east toward the Sierra Nevada mountains. As fronts approach, they are forced upward by the peaks, causing them to drop their moisture in the form of rain or snowfall onto the range (orographic lift). Precipitation runoff from this mountain drains into the Middle Fork Kings River.

Climbing
Non-technical routes:

 West Ridge –  – First ascent June 24, 1951, by Richard Searle, William Wirt
 Northeast Face – class 4 – FA by Donald Goodrich, Robert Means also on June 24, 1951
 North Wall – class 4 – FA by Locker, Albright, G. Hufbauer, and K. Hufbauer

Established rock climbing routes:

 North Face –  A3 – FA 1968 by T. M. Herbert, Don Lauria, Dennis Hennick
 Edge of Time Arête  –  – 14 pitches – FA 1991 by Dave Nettle and Jim Howle
 Quality Time – class 5.10b – 9 pitches – FA 2003 by Urmas Franosch, Peter Mayfield
 Wild Kingdom  – class 5.11- – 16 pitches – FA 2019 by Katie Lambert, Ben Ditto

Gallery

See also

 List of mountain peaks of California

References

External links

 Weather forecast: The Citadel
 The Citadel Rock Climbing: Mountainproject.com
 The Citadel and Ladder Lake photo: Flickr
 Summit view video: Flickr

Mountains of Fresno County, California
Mountains of Kings Canyon National Park
North American 3000 m summits
Mountains of Northern California
Sierra Nevada (United States)